Rebekah Weatherspoon is an American author and romance novelist. Her books often feature heroines who are Black, plus-size, disabled, and/or LGBTQ. She founded the website WOC in Romance. Weatherspoon received a 2017 Lambda Literary Award for her novel Soul to Keep and was an honoree at the inaugural Ripped Bodice Awards for Excellence in Romance Fiction for Xeni.

Career 
Weatherspoon previously worked at Disney and was asked by an executive to read Twilight due to the buzz around it. She then began to read fan fiction based on the book, as well as romance novels. Weatherspoon wrote her own fanfic in digital fandom communities and received positive feedback. Her debut, Better Off Red, was published in 2011. She published a trilogy called FIT featuring a BDSM story line under Bold Strokes Books in 2014.

Weatherspoon has self-published and released her work through traditional publishers. She is known for featuring Black women protagonists in her books, many who are LGBTQ or plus-size. Her books often combine romance and erotica.

In 2015, Weatherspoon was influenced by the We Need Diverse Books and #WeNeedDiverseRomance campaigns to found the website WOC in Romance. The site shares information about romance novels written by women of color and those who are non-binary and gender fluid.

On February 25, 2020, she published the debut novel in the Cowboys of California series, a Cowboy to Remember, a Western romance and a remake of Sleeping Beauty. It received a starred review from Publishers Weekly. Kirkus Reviews described the book: "an amnesia plot done right and a fantastic heroine mark a strong series debut." Maureen Lee Lenker wrote in a review for EW, "most refreshingly, her cowboys don’t fall prey to any of the traps of toxic masculinity that can overwhelm the sub-genre. Instead, it engages only with the positive aspects – the boot-knocking inherent sexiness of cowboys; the hard work of maintaining a ranch; and the natural ethos of family and community." A television series adaptation is in development by Valerie C. Woods' MVC Productions.

In February 2021, Weatherspoon's upcoming YA romance novel Her Good Side was acquired by Razorbill. It is scheduled for release in fall 2022.

Personal life 
Weatherspoon resides in southern California. She has identified as queer and pansexual.

Accolades 
 2014 ― Lambda Literary Award for Lesbian Erotic Fiction, Nominee (for At Her Feet)
 2017 ― Lambda Literary Award for LGBT Erotica, Winner (for Soul to Keep)
 2018 ― GO, 100 Women We Love
 2020 ― The Ripped Bodice Awards for Excellence in Romance Fiction, Honoree (for Xeni)
 2021 ― Booklist Editors' Choice (for A Thorn In the Saddle)

Bibliography 

 
 At Her Feet. 2013. 
 Treasure. 2014.

Series

Vampire Sorority Series 
 
 Blacker than Blue. 2013. 
 Soul to Keep. 2016. 
Beards and Bondage
 Haven. 2017 
 Sanctuary. 2017. 
 Harbor. 2020

Loose Ends 
 Rafe. 2018. 
 Xeni: A Marriage of Inconvenience. 2019.

Cowboys of California 
 A Cowboy to Remember. 2020. 
 If the Boot Fits. 2020. 
 A Thorn In the Saddle. 2021.

References

External links 
 Official website
 WOC in Romance

Year of birth missing (living people)
Living people
American romantic fiction writers
Women romantic fiction writers
American LGBT writers
LGBT African Americans
Pansexual women
Queer women
Queer writers
American erotica writers
21st-century American women writers
21st-century African-American women writers
21st-century African-American writers